The Maruti Suzuki 800 is a city car that was manufactured by Maruti Suzuki in India from 1983 to 2014. The first generation (SS80) was based on the 1979 Suzuki Alto and had an 800 cc F8B engine, hence the moniker. Widely regarded as the most influential automobile in India, about 2.87 million 800s were produced during its course of which 2.66 million were sold in India itself.

Produced for 31 years, the Maruti Suzuki 800 remains the second longest production car in India, next only to Hindustan Ambassador.

History

In the 1980s and early 1990s, the name "Maruti" was synonymous with the Maruti Suzuki 800. It remained the best-selling car in India until 2004, when the Maruti Suzuki Alto took the title. It was also exported to a number of countries in South Asia including Nepal, Bangladesh and Sri Lanka and was also available in Morocco and selected European markets, often sold as the Suzuki Maruti. In an elaborate ceremony held in New Delhi on 14 December 1983, then Prime Minister Indira Gandhi handed over keys of the very first car to Mr. Harpal Singh S/O Haridas Singh, who won the ownership rights through a lucky draw. The original 800 was based on the Suzuki Fronte SS80, but a modernized aerodynamic version using the body of the second-generation Alto (SB308) was presented in late 1986. The introduction of this car did revolutionize the automotive industry in India. Right from its inception, it was considered as the first affordable people's car, the first modern era front wheel drive and high speed small contemporary vehicle, and the only reasonably modern car available in India, the incumbent mainstay Hindustan Ambassador and Premier Padmini being based on long-obsolete 1950s designs. The delivery was against bookings done directly with Maruti Udyog Limited (A Govt. of India undertaking). The prospective owner would then have to wait for almost three years after booking till delivery. Such extended waiting times gave rise to some people indulging into black marketing and earning premiums as much as 40%. Cars produced during the early years were essentially Suzuki OEM components imported from Japan and merely assembled by Maruti Udyog Limited at the Gurgaon plant.

Exports to neighboring countries commenced in 1987, and were followed by a shipment of 500 cars to Hungary, with the first car arriving on 24 October 1987. Soon, exports to Czechoslovakia and Yugoslavia followed, two other markets with less restrictive homologation requirements than Western Europe. After successes there, and in spite of Suzuki's objections, Maruti Suzuki tackled more competitive markets and entered France in 1989, the Netherlands in 1990, followed by England, Malta, and Italy. In markets where Japanese cars had a quota, the 800 was sold as a Maruti, with all mention of Suzuki carefully removed – even the manuals were revised, so as not to fall afoul of the quota requirements. The 800 continued to be sold in Italy and other Western European markets until 2004, when it could no longer be made to meet emissions and safety equipment. The Maruti Suzuki had never been equipped with seat belts until exports began, meaning that such parts originally had to be imported from Japan to be fitted to export market cars, as with everything relating to building left-hand-drive cars. The Maruti also got its first catalytic converter to meet European requirements. The cleaner  version first arrived in August 1992 and was originally reserved for Europe.

Phase-out
Maruti Suzuki had begun a phase-out of Maruti Suzuki 800 beginning in April 2010. Maruti Suzuki did not have plans to upgrade it to Euro IV or BS IV emission norms. Starting in April 2010, Maruti halted sales of the car in 13 major cities: the four metros of Chennai, Delhi, Kolkata, Mumbai and 9 other cities including Kanpur, Bangalore, Hyderabad, Pune, Ahmedabad, Agra and Surat, where the law made it mandatory for the vehicles sold to be Euro IV compliant.

Another reason cited was the relatively outdated model's declining sales. Maruti Suzuki 800 sales were down by 3.7% in April 2010, when compared with April 2009. Total sales of Maruti Suzuki 800 was 33028 for the period April 2009 to March 2010. The Indian Automobile industry is the seventh largest in the world, with an annual production of over 4 million vehicles and exports of about 600,000. In 2009, India emerged as Asia's fourth largest exporter of automobiles, behind Japan, South Korea and Thailand.

The last Maruti Suzuki 800 was rolled off the production lines on 18 January 2014.

Changes

After a full model change in 1986, the 800 has undergone some minor facelifts but overall it still remains the same as it was on introduction. The car has reported slipping sales in recent times, mainly due to the introduction of the Alto at a comparable price. Maruti Suzuki had earlier launched a version with a twelve-valve version of the engine producing , coupled with a five-speed manual transmission (currently found in the Suzuki Alto) but discontinued it after a couple of years. The second generation Maruti Suzuki 800 that was produced from 1986–1997 underwent some changes in its appearance. The original grille that was introduced in 1986 was a horizontal slat grille with 'Maruti 800' monogram at the right hand corner. This grille was replaced by a mesh grille with the Maruti Logo on the centre in October 1994. Also, the bonnet opener that was placed on the bonnet was replaced by an ejection button inside of the car. The hubcaps were also changed from the shiny silver ones to plastic ones. Several new colours were also introduced, such as Maruti Green, St Germaine Red, Pearl White, Neptune Blue, etc.

A Euro III emission-compliant version of the car was released in 2005 to meet Indian emissions regulations. An LPG version of the vehicle was also released in 2008. As of September 2009, the company has yet to reach a decision regarding the manufacture of a Euro IV-compliant version of the vehicle because it would increase the retail price. However even stricter emissions regulations which came into effect by April 2010, would mandate Euro IV compliance in major Indian cities including Delhi, Mumbai, Hyderabad and Bangalore and 2015–2016 for the remainder of the country. By 2005, Maruti Suzuki had planned to phase out the 800 around 2010. but it was still on sale in October 2011. Its main competitor is the less expensive Tata Nano (123,000 compared to 184,641 rupees) which has an 8 percent smaller exterior size and a noisier engine with less torque. But in 2011, Maruti Suzuki declared to relaunch Maruti Suzuki 800 compliant Euro IV emission norms to tap the small car market directly competing Tata Nano but later on Maruti Suzuki decided to phase out as it was not feasible for the company.

Technical specifications

Dimensions and weights
Overall length: 
Overall width: 
Overall height: 
Wheelbase: 
Front track width: 1215 mm (47.835 in)
Rear track width: 1200 mm (47.244 in)
Ground clearance: 
Kerb weight:  without A.C., 665 kg (1.466 lb) with A.C.
Gross vehicle weight:

Capacities
Seating capacity: 4 people maximum
Fuel tank capacity: 
Engine oil : ~2.7 L including oil filter
Transmission oil: ~2.1 L
Coolant: 3.5 L
Windscreen Washer Fluid: 1.75 Lt

Performance
Maximum speed:  F8B MPFI; 145 km/h (90.1 mph)
: 14 seconds

Fuel economy
Mileage highway: 
Mileage city: 
Mileage overall:

Engine
Engine model: F8B MPFI (4-speed), F8D MPFI (5-speed)
Displacement: 
Valves per cylinder: 2 (F8B), 4 (F8D)
Number of cylinders: 3 inline
Fuel type: Petrol
Peak Power: 37 BHP at 5500 rpm (F8B), 45 BHP at 6000 rpm (F8D)
Top Speed: 140Kmph

Transmission
Transmission type: Manual
Gears: four-speed gearbox (F8B), 5-speed gearbox (F8D)

Suspension
Front suspension: MacPherson strut and coil spring
Rear suspension: Coil spring with gas-filled shock absorbers

Steering
Steering type: Rack and pinion
Minimum turning radius:

Brakes
 Front brakes: Disc
 Rear brakes: Drum
 Brake mechanism: Hydraulic

Wheels and tyres
 Tyres (radial optional): 145/70 R12

See also
 Maruti Suzuki Alto
 Maruti Suzuki Zen

References

External links

Maruti 800

 

Cars introduced in 1983
1990s cars
2000s cars
2010s cars
800
City cars
First car made by manufacturer
OEM Suzuki vehicles
Cars discontinued in 2014